Joel Díaz (born February 18, 1973) is a Mexican former professional boxer. He is the brother of Antonio Díaz and former world champion Julio Díaz.

Professional career
In August 1992, Díaz beat the former IBF Champion Julio César Borboa.

On October 19, 1996, Joel lost a twelve-round decision to undefeated IBF lightweight champion Philip Holiday in Wembley Indoor Arena, Johannesburg.

His last bout ever was a knockout win over the veteran José Luis Montes. This win made Díaz the number one rated contender and mandatory to then WBC lightweight champion, Stevie Johnston. Due to a detached retina that left him blind from one eye Díaz retired from boxing.

Training career
Díaz has worked as a trainer for years. Some of the notable fighters who have trained under Díaz include, Antonio Díaz, Julio Díaz, Timothy Bradley, Abner Mares, Vicente Escobedo, UFC fighter Cub Swanson and Ruslan Provodnikov.

Boxers trained
Antonio Díaz, former International Boxing Association light welterweight and WBO Latino light middleweight champion
Ruslan Provodnikov, former WBO light welterweight champion
Julio Díaz, former IBF lightweight champion
Timothy Bradley, former two-time WBC and WBO light welterweight and former WBO welterweight champion
Abner Mares, former IBF bantamweight, former WBC super bantamweight former WBC featherweight champion.
Vicente Escobedo, title contender and Olympic boxer for the U.S. in 2004
Diego De La Hoya, an undefeated Mexican professional boxer in the featherweight division. De la Hoya represented Mexico in international tournaments and was one of the top rated Featherweights in his country, signed to Oscar De La Hoya's Golden Boy Promotions
Omar Figueroa, an undefeated lightweight boxer signed to Golden Boy Promotions
Jamie Kavanagh,  Irish lightweight boxer signed to Golden Boy Promotions
 Lucas Matthysse
 Francisco Vargas

See also
Notable boxing families

References

External links

People from Jiquilpan, Michoacán
Boxers from Michoacán
Mexican boxing trainers
Living people
1973 births
Mexican male boxers
Lightweight boxers
20th-century Mexican people
21st-century Mexican people